Donald Rone Jr. (born December 21, 1944) is an American politician from the state of Missouri. A lifelong resident of Portageville, Missouri, he served as mayor of Portageville, Missouri, for 10 years.  In 2014, he was elected as a Republican to serve as a member of the Missouri House of Representatives, representing the 149th District, which includes all of New Madrid County as well as portions of Mississippi County and Pemiscot County.  In 2014, he defeated local opera singer and America's Got Talent winner Neal E. Boyd in the Republican primary and former U.S. Congressman Bill Burlison in the general election.

Electoral history

References

1944 births
Living people
Military personnel from Missouri
Mayors of places in Missouri
Missouri Republicans
People from Portageville, Missouri
Southeast Missouri State University alumni
21st-century American politicians